Trader Tom of the China Seas is a 1954 Republic film serial directed by Franklin Adreon and starring Harry Lauter, Aline Towne, Lyle Talbot, Robert Shayne, Fred Graham, and Richard Reeves.  In 1966 the serial was edited into Century 66 100-minute television film with the new title Target: Sea of China.

Plot
The United Nations has island trader Tom Rogers and Vivian Wells, daughter of a schooner captain, spearheading the effort to keep subversive native groups from starting revolutions in Burmatra and neighboring Asian countries.

Cast
 Harry Lauter as Tom Rogers
 Aline Towne as Vivian Wells
 Lyle Talbot as Barent
 Robert Shayne as Major Conroy
 Fred Graham as Kurt Daley
 Richard Reeves as Rebel Chief
 John Crawford as Bill Gaines
 George Selk as Ole

Production
Trader Tom of the China Seas was budgeted at $172,789 although the final negative cost was $169,248 (a $3,541, or 2%, under spend).  It was the cheapest Republic serial of 1954.  It was filmed between 8 September and 28 September 1953.  The serial's production number was 1937.

Stunts
Dale Van Sickel as Tom Rogers/Rebel Assassin in Jeep (doubling Harry Lauter)
Tom Steele as Gursan
Fred Graham
Bert LeBaron as Railroad Fireman
Ken Terrell as Crewman

Special Effects
Special effects were created by the Lydecker brothers.

Release

Theatrical
Trader Tom of the China Seas'''s official release date is 11 January 1954, although this is actually the date the sixth chapter was made available to film exchanges.  This was followed by a re-release of Secret Service in Darkest Africa, re-titled as Manhunt in the African Jungles, instead of a new serial.  The next new serial, Man with the Steel Whip, followed in the summer.

TelevisionTrader Tom of the China Seas was one of twenty-six Republic serials re-released as a Century 66 film on television in 1966.  The title of the film was changed to Target: Sea of China''.  This version was cut down to 100-minutes in length.

Critical reception
Cline describes this serial as just a "quickie."

Chapter titles
 Sea Saboteurs (20min)
 Death Takes the Deck (13min 20s)
 Five Fathoms Down (13min 20s)
 On Target (13min 20s)
 The Fire Ship (13min 20s)
 Collision (13min 20s)
 War in the Hills (13min 20s)
 Native Execution (13min 20s)
 Mass Attack (13min 20s)
 Machine Murder (13min 20s) - a re-cap chapter
 Underwater Ambush (13min 20s)
 Twisted Vengeance (13min 20s)
Source:

See also
 List of film serials
 List of film serials by studio

References

External links

1954 films
1954 adventure films
American black-and-white films
1950s English-language films
Republic Pictures film serials
Seafaring films
American adventure films
Films directed by Franklin Adreon
1950s American films